The men's eight was a rowing event held as part of the Rowing at the 1912 Summer Olympics programme. It was the fourth appearance of the event. The competition was held from Wednesday to Friday, 17 to 19 July 1912. Ninety-nine rowers (11 boats) from eight nations competed. Nations were still permitted to have two boats each in the event. The event was won by the Leander Club of Great Britain, successfully defending their 1908 Olympic title. Silver also went to Great Britain, with the New College Boat Club the second British boat. Germany earned its first medal in the men's eight with a bronze by the Berliner Ruderverein von 1876 (Berlin rowing club of 1876). The final was marred in controversy when Leander's team acted outside the customary convention after the coin toss.

Background

This was the fourth appearance of the event. Rowing had been on the programme in 1896 but was cancelled due to bad weather. The men's eight has been held every time that rowing has been contested, beginning in 1900.

The defending Olympic champion was the Leander Club of Great Britain. Leander's rowers came primarily from Magdalen College, Oxford. Magdalen had won the Grand Challenge Cup at Henley in 1910 and 1911. The other British boat came from another Oxford college, the New College Boat Club.

Canada was represented for the third time by the Argonaut Rowing Club of Toronto, the silver medalists in 1904 and bronze medalists in 1908. The Argonauts had won the 1911 National Association of Amateur Oarsmen title.

A notable absence was Belgium's Royal Club Nautique de Gand; Belgium had won the 1910 European Rowing Championships and the Gand club had won the 1909 Grand Challenge Cup, as well as having taken silver at the 1908 Olympics. The United States again did not compete.

Australasia and Sweden each made their debut in the event. Canada made its third appearance, most among nations to that point.

Starting list

The following boats and/or rowing clubs participated:

 Sydney Rowing Club
 Argonaut Rowing Club
 Société Nautique de Bayonne
 Berliner Ruderverein von 1876
 Sport Borussia, Berlin
 Leander Club
 New College Boat Club
 Hungária Evezős Egylet
 Christiania Roklub
 Göteborgs Roddklubb
 Roddklubben af 1912

Competition format

The "eight" event featured nine-person boats, with eight rowers and a coxswain. It was a sweep rowing event, with the rowers each having one oar (and thus each rowing on one side). For the first time, the Olympic course used the now-standard distance of 2000 metres.

The 1912 tournament featured four rounds of one-on-one races; with 11 boats in the competition, there were 5 contested heats and 1 walkover in the first round. The six boats advancing from the first round competed in three quarterfinals. The semifinal round had only one contested race, with the loser receiving bronze; the other semifinal was a walkover. The final determined the gold and silver medals.

Schedule

Results

First round

The heats were held on Wednesday, 17 July.

Heat 1

Heat 2

Heat 3

Heat 4

Heat 5

Heat 6

The Swedish boat raced without opponent.

Quarterfinals

All quarterfinals were held on Thursday, 18 July.

Quarterfinal 1

Quarterfinal 2

Quarterfinal 3

Semifinals

Both semifinals were held on Friday, 19 July.

Semifinal 1

The New College team raced without opponent, but "gave the spectators a good opportunity of seeing the pure English style of rowing, with its firm grip of the water and the quiet, almost stealthy recovery."

Semifinal 2

At the very start, Leander managed to get a couple of metres' lead, but the German crew soon recovered itself, and at the 500 met. mark was leading by about half a length. As seen from the shore, the English eight seemed to take the race very quietly, rowing scarcely more than 34 to their opponents' 38, and at the 1,000 metres mark the Germans were leading by nearly a length. ... Just before reaching the boat-house, Leander, which had the outside curve, spurted and managed to pick up about half a length, while the Germans ... committed the fault of not making use of the advantage given by the possession of the inner curve, and making an extra exertion which have certainly increased the distance between them and the English crew, or, in any case, would have kept them at their previous distance in the rear. Fleming put his men to a severe test from the bath-house to the bridge, and the determination and speed by means of which Leander drew level with their opponents after one minute's rapid spurt, were simply unique. The German crew was not rowed out, however, and a desperate struggle took place all the way from the bridge to the finish, the result being that Leander won by about half a length ... .|Official Report, pp. 666–67.}}

Final

The final was held on Friday, 19 July, between the two British teams. It resulted in controversy after the coin toss for choice of lanes. The two lanes of the Djurgårdsbrunnsviken course were markedly different, with a clearly better lane. By tradition, the winner of the coin toss would offer the choice to the other boat, which would politely decline. After New College won the toss and offered the choice to Leander, however, Leander did not decline but instead chose the better lane. When Leander won the final, New College stroke Robert Bourne, angry over the choice, supposedly said "God damn bloody Magdalen" (referring to the Oxford college from which most of the Leander team hailed). At the medal ceremony, King Gustaf V presented his colors to New College (though the gold medals and Challenge Trophy went to Leander); the New College Boat Club has since used the Swedish Royal House colors of purple and gold. New College has also taken "God damn bloody Magdalen" as a toast and put the abbreviation "GDBM" on its letterhead.

References

Sources
 
 

Rowing at the 1912 Summer Olympics